The PlayStation 5 is a video game console by Sony Interactive Entertainment.

PS5 and variations thereof may also refer to:

 Constituency PS-5 (Ghotki-I), a constituency of the Provincial Assembly of Sindh
 Minardi PS05, a Formula One race car used by Minardi Cosworth in the 2005 Formula One season
 PS-05/A, a pulse-doppler radar currently used by the JAS 39 Gripen fighter aircraft